Hussein Mahmoud Ferzat (born 1957) has been a Syrian Minister of State since 2011.

Ferzat was born in 1957 in Hama. He earned a degree in architecture at the University of Aleppo in 1980. He was a member of the Hama City Council for three sessions. He has been a member of Parliament, a member of the Engineers Syndicate in Damascus, branch secretary of the Arab Socialist Movement Hama, a member of the Political Bureau, and Chief of the Office of the movement organization.

Ferzat is married and has two sons and three daughters.

See also
Cabinet of Syria

References

Minister of State Hussein Mahmoud Ferzat, SANA
Biography of the new Syrian government 2011 - the names and lives of government ministers, Syria FM, 17 April 2011

1957 births
Living people
Syrian ministers of state
University of Aleppo alumni